Jaime Bailón Galindo (born 3 January 1978) a Paralympic swimmer from Spain.

Personal 
Bailón is from the Madrid region of Spain. He has a physical disability.

Swimming 
Bailón is an S8 classified swimmer, and is affiliated with the Integra Sports Foundation.

Bailón  competed at the 2011 IPC European Swimming Championships in Berlin, Germany, where he won a gold medal in the 4x50 meter medley relay.  He finished sixth in the 100 meter butterfly race. In 2012, he competed at the Paralympic Swimming Championship of Spain by Autonomous Communities.
He competed at the 2013 IPC Swimming World Championships.  He was one of fourteen swimmers from the CN Alcobendas swimming club to participate in a competition at South Park Rivas Vaciamadrid in December 2013.

Notes

References

External links 
 

1978 births
Living people
Spanish male freestyle swimmers
Paralympic swimmers of Spain